The United States has competed at every edition of the World Athletics Championships since its inception in 1983. It has been the most successful nation at the global competition for track and field. By the end of the 2017 World Championships, its athletes had won a total of 385 medals, 168 of them gold – more than double that of the next most successful nation Kenya, as well as more than the combined total of the Soviet Union and post-Soviet states. It has been the top nation in the championships medal table at every edition bar 1983 and 1987 (East Germany), 2001 (Russia) and 2015 (Kenya). It also ranks number one on points in the national placing tables. As one of the foremost nations in the sport internationally, its delegations for the championships are among the largest. It also won the first title of "World Team Champions" inaugurated for the Oregon 2022.

The most decorated athlete of the competition's history is American: Allyson Felix has won 20 World Championships medals, eleven of them gold, competing across the individual and relay sprint events. Among men, the United States has three of the four most decorated men (after Usain Bolt), all of them sprinters; LaShawn Merritt has eleven medals, Carl Lewis won ten and Michael Johnson won eight. All three won eight gold medals. Johnson is the nation's most successful athlete individually (and the third most successful overall), having won six gold medals in the 200-meter dash and 400-meter dash. American Gail Devers is the second most successful woman individually, with four golds and two silver medals from the 100-meter dash and 100-meter hurdles. Felix and Amy Acuff have made the most appearances for the United States, each having represented their country at eight separate editions.

The United States team was affected by doping during the period from 1997 to 2003, principally in sprinting events. The loss of several gold medals in 2001 resulted in the United States dropping to second in the medal rankings for the first time since 1987.

Medal table

Multiple medalists

Best placings
Of the 50 events that have been held over the history of the championships, 30 have been won by American athletes (17 men's events and 13 women's events). A further 4 men's and 5 women's events have featured an American medallist at some point. Americans have topped the podium in all sprint and hurdles events, as well as all the men's jumps. By far the weakest events of the United States are men's and women's racewalking and women's throws – only four bronze medals have been won by American athletes in these disciplines, among a total of over 350 medals across events. Americans have featured in the final at some point of every discipline contested at the championships.

This table shows the best place finish by an American athlete by event. Where the best position has been achieved multiple times, the first instance is shown.

Doping

References

IAAF Statistics Book – IAAF World Championships London 2017
USA at the 2017 World Championships in Athletics

 
United States
World Championships in Athletics